P.A.S. Korinthos, also known simply as Korinthos or with its full name Pagkorinthiakos Athlitikos Syllogos Korinthos (Pan-corinthian Athletic Club) is a Greek football club based in the city of Corinth, Greece. Pagkorinthiakos can literally be translated as "Pan-corinthian", which means "of all Corinth (Korinthos in English literature)".

History
The history of the club began in 1957 when Pagkorinthiakos was formed after the amalgamation of the two teams of CorinthOlympiakos Korinthos and A.E. Korinthos.  In 1963 the club merged with Aris Korinthos to form A.P.S Korinthos.  In 1999 Korinthos merged with a re-established Pagkorinthiakos to form the current P.A.S. Korinthos.In 2022 the worst ever days came when Alexis Kougias took over the team.

League history

Summary
 6 seasons in Greek top level, Super League Greece. Last one in 1992–93 season when it was Alpha Ethniki.
 29 seasons in Football League. Last one in 1994–95 season when it was Beta Ethniki.
 10 seasons in Football League 2. Last one in 2013–14 season.
 8 seasons in Delta Ethniki. Last one in 2011–12 season.
 5 seasons in Corinthia Football Clubs Association (E.P.S. Corinthia) Premier Division. Last one in 2016–17 season.

Season by Season

{|class="wikitable"
|-bgcolor="#efefef"
! Season
! Level
! Division
! Group
! Position
! Result

|-
|align=center|1959–60
|align=center|1
|align=center rowspan="1"|Alpha Ethniki
|align=center|
|align=center|14
|align=center|relegated to 2nd division after play-off, as Pagkorinthiakos*

|-
|align=center|1960–61
|align=center|2
|align=center rowspan="1"|Beta Ethniki
|align=center|Pireaus Group
|align=center|9
|align=center|

|-
|align=center|1961–62
|align=center|2
|align=center rowspan="1"|Beta Ethniki 
|align=center|South/3rd Group
|align=center bgcolor="gold"|1
|align=center|Champion – 2nd in promotion play-off, did not get promoted

|-
|align=center|1962–63
|align=center|2
|align=center rowspan="1"|Beta Ethniki 
|align=center|2nd Group
|align=center bgcolor="gold"|1
|align=center|Champion – 4th in promotion play-off, did not get promoted

|-
|align=center|1963–64
|align=center|2
|align=center rowspan="1"|Beta Ethniki
|align=center|2nd Group
|align=center|8
|align=center|

|-
|align=center|1964–65
|align=center|2
|align=center rowspan="1"|Beta Ethniki
|align=center|2nd Group
|align=center bgcolor="silver"|2
|align=center|as Korinthos S.C.*

|-
|align=center|1965–66
|align=center|2
|align=center rowspan="1"|Beta Ethniki
|align=center|2nd Group
|align=center|14
|align=center|

|-
|align=center|1966–67
|align=center|2
|align=center rowspan="1"|Beta Ethniki
|align=center|2nd Group
|align=center|10
|align=center|

|-
|align=center|1967–68
|align=center|2
|align=center rowspan="1"|Beta Ethniki
|align=center|South Group
|align=center|14
|align=center|

|-
|align=center|1968–69
|align=center|2
|align=center rowspan="1"|Beta Ethniki
|align=center|South Group
|align=center|13
|align=center|

|-
|align=center|1969–70
|align=center|2
|align=center rowspan="1"|Beta Ethniki
|align=center|First Group
|align=center bgcolor="silver"|2
|align=center|

|-
|align=center|1970–71
|align=center|2
|align=center rowspan="1"|Beta Ethniki
|align=center|First Group
|align=center|6
|align=center|

|-
|align=center|1971–72
|align=center|2
|align=center rowspan="1"|Beta Ethniki
|align=center|First Group
|align=center|7
|align=center|

|-
|align=center|1972–73
|align=center|2
|align=center rowspan="1"|Beta Ethniki
|align=center|First Group
|align=center|4
|align=center|

|-
|align=center|1973–74
|align=center|2
|align=center rowspan="1"|Beta Ethniki
|align=center|First Group
|align=center bgcolor="silver"|2
|align=center|3rd in promotion play-off, did not get promoted

|-
|align=center|1974–75
|align=center|2
|align=center rowspan="1"|Beta Ethniki
|align=center|First Group
|align=center|7
|align=center|

|-
|align=center|1975–76
|align=center|2
|align=center rowspan="1"|Beta Ethniki
|align=center|South Group
|align=center|9
|align=center|

|-
|align=center|1976–77
|align=center|2
|align=center rowspan="1"|Beta Ethniki
|align=center|South Group
|align=center bgcolor="silver"|2
|align=center|

|-
|align=center|1977–78
|align=center|2
|align=center rowspan="1"|Beta Ethniki
|align=center|South Group
|align=center|8
|align=center|

|-
|align=center|1978–79
|align=center|2
|align=center rowspan="1"|Beta Ethniki
|align=center|South Group
|align=center bgcolor="gold"|1
|align=center|Champion, promoted to 1st division

|-
|align=center|1979–80
|align=center|1
|align=center rowspan="1"|Alpha Ethniki
|align=center|
|align=center|10
|align=center|

|-
|align=center|1980–81
|align=center|1
|align=center rowspan="1"|Alpha Ethniki
|align=center|
|align=center|16
|align=center|

|-
|align=center|1981–82
|align=center|1
|align=center rowspan="1"|Alpha Ethniki
|align=center|
|align=center|18
|align=center|relegated to 2nd division

|-
|align=center|1982–83
|align=center|2
|align=center rowspan="1"|Beta Ethniki
|align=center|South Group
|align=center|5
|align=center|

|-
|align=center|1983–84
|align=center|2
|align=center rowspan="1"|Beta Ethniki
|align=center|
|align=center|9
|align=center|

|-
|align=center|1984–85
|align=center|2
|align=center rowspan="1"|Beta Ethniki
|align=center|
|align=center|19
|align=center|relegated to 3rd division

|-
|align=center|1985–86
|align=center|3
|align=center rowspan="1"|Gamma Ethniki
|align=center|South Group
|align=center bgcolor="silver"|2
|align=center|promoted to 2nd division

|-
|align=center|1986–87
|align=center|2
|align=center rowspan="1"|Beta Ethniki
|align=center|
|align=center|6
|align=center|

|-
|align=center|1987–88
|align=center|2
|align=center rowspan="1"|Beta Ethniki
|align=center|
|align=center|6
|align=center|

|-
|align=center|1988–89
|align=center|2
|align=center rowspan="1"|Beta Ethniki
|align=center|
|align=center|4
|align=center|4th in promotion play-off, did not get promoted

|-
|align=center|1989–90
|align=center|2
|align=center rowspan="1"|Beta Ethniki
|align=center|
|align=center|8
|align=center|

|-
|align=center|1990–91
|align=center|2
|align=center rowspan="1"|Beta Ethniki
|align=center|
|align=center bgcolor="silver"|2
|align=center|promoted to 1st division

|-
|align=center|1991–92
|align=center|1
|align=center rowspan="1"|Alpha Ethniki
|align=center|
|align=center|10
|align=center|

|-
|align=center|1992–93
|align=center|1
|align=center rowspan="1"|Alpha Ethniki
|align=center|
|align=center|18
|align=center|relegated to 2nd division

|-
|align=center|1993–94
|align=center|2
|align=center rowspan="1"|Beta Ethniki
|align=center|
|align=center|13
|align=center|

|-
|align=center|1994–95
|align=center|2
|align=center rowspan="1"|Beta Ethniki
|align=center|
|align=center|18
|align=center|relegated to 3rd division

|-
|align=center|1995–96
|align=center|3
|align=center rowspan="1"|Gamma Ethniki
|align=center|South Group
|align=center|11
|align=center|

|-
|align=center|1996–97
|align=center|3
|align=center rowspan="1"|Gamma Ethniki
|align=center|South Group
|align=center|12
|align=center|

|-
|align=center|1997–98
|align=center|3
|align=center rowspan="1"|Gamma Ethniki
|align=center|South Group
|align=center|14
|align=center|relegated to 4th division

|-
|align=center|1998–99
|align=center|4
|align=center rowspan="1"|Delta Ethniki
|align=center|Third Group
|align=center|6
|align=center|as P.A.S. Korinthos*

|-
|align=center|1999–00
|align=center|4
|align=center rowspan="1"|Delta Ethniki
|align=center|First Group
|align=center|14
|align=center|relegated to Corinthia Football Clubs Association

|-
|align=center|2000–01
|align=center|5
|align=center rowspan="1"|Corinthia Football Clubs Association
|align=center|Premier Division
|align=center|TBC
|align=center|

|-
|align=center|2001–02
|align=center|5
|align=center rowspan="1"|Corinthia Football Clubs Association
|align=center|Premier Division
|align=center|TBC
|align=center|promoted to 4th division

|-
|align=center|2002–03
|align=center|4
|align=center rowspan="1"|Delta Ethniki
|align=center|Eighth Group
|align=center bgcolor="brown"|3
|align=center|

|-
|align=center|2003–04
|align=center|4
|align=center rowspan="1"|Delta Ethniki
|align=center|Eighth Group
|align=center|10
|align=center|

|-
|align=center|2004–05
|align=center|4
|align=center rowspan="1"|Delta Ethniki
|align=center|Ninth Group
|align=center bgcolor="silver"|2
|align=center|

|-
|align=center|2005–06
|align=center|4
|align=center rowspan="1"|Delta Ethniki
|align=center|Seventh Group
|align=center bgcolor="silver"|2
|align=center|

|-
|align=center|2006–07
|align=center|4
|align=center rowspan="1"|Delta Ethniki
|align=center|Seventh Group
|align=center bgcolor="gold"|1
|align=center|Champion – promoted to 3rd division

|-
|align=center|2007–08
|align=center|3
|align=center rowspan="1"|Gamma Ethniki
|align=center|South Group
|align=center|4
|align=center|

|-
|align=center|2008–09
|align=center|3
|align=center rowspan="1"|Gamma Ethniki
|align=center|South Group
|align=center|5
|align=center|

|-
|align=center|2009–10
|align=center|3
|align=center rowspan="1"|Gamma Ethniki
|align=center|South Group
|align=center|9
|align=center|

|-
|align=center|2010–11
|align=center|3
|align=center rowspan="1"|Football League 2
|align=center|South Group
|align=center|6
|align=center|relegated to 4th division due to irregularities during player transfers

|-
|align=center|2011–12
|align=center|4
|align=center rowspan="1"|Delta Ethniki
|align=center|Seventh Group
|align=center bgcolor="gold"|1
|align=center|Champion – promoted to 3rd division

|-
|align=center|2012–13
|align=center|3
|align=center rowspan="1"|Football League 2
|align=center|South Group
|align=center|11
|align=center|

|-
|align=center|2013–14
|align=center|3
|align=center rowspan="1"|Football League 2
|align=center|Fourth Group
|align=center|10
|align=center|relegated to Corinthia Football Clubs Association because Delta Ethniki was abolished in 2013

|-
|align=center|2014–15
|align=center|4
|align=center rowspan="1"|Corinthia Football Clubs Association
|align=center|Premier Division
|align=center|TBC
|align=center|

|-
|align=center|2015–16
|align=center|4
|align=center rowspan="1"|Corinthia Football Clubs Association
|align=center|Premier Division
|align=center|TBC
|align=center|

|-
|align=center|2016–17
|align=center|4
|align=center rowspan="1"|Corinthia Football Clubs Association
|align=center|Premier Division
|align=center|TBC
|align=center|

|-
|}

International record

Titles and honours
 Football League – Champion: 3
 1961–62, 1962–63, 1978–79
 Football League – Runner Up: 5
 1964–65, 1969–70, 1973–74, 1976–77, 1990–91
 Football League 2 – Runner Up: 1
 1985–86
 Delta Ethniki – Champion: 2
 2004–05, 2005–06
 Delta Ethniki – Runner Up: 2
 2006–07, 2011–12

Current squad

Notable former staff

This section contains players and managers that have been part of the Greek "big-4" football clubs (Olympiacos, Panathinaikos, AEK Athens, PAOK) or members of their respective national teams.

Managers

Czech Republic
  Petr Packert
Greece
  Nikos Alefantos

Players

Greece
  Angelos Anastasiadis
  Iakovos Hatziathanasiou
  Thanasis Intzoglou
  Makis Katsavakis
  Nikos Kourmpanas
  Giannis Marditsis
  Kostas Mpatsinilas
  Mihalis Mylonas
  Giannis Pathiakakis
  Hristos Petriniotis
  Ioannis Stefas
  Giorgos Togias
  Dionysis Tsamis
Poland
  Mirosław Okoński
Romania
  Dănuţ Lupu

References

External links
 Official Facebook

Sport in Corinthia
Football clubs in Peloponnese (region)
Association football clubs established in 1957
1957 establishments in Greece